ORP Orzeł a Polish Navy submarine of Project 613 . She was built in the Soviet Union as S-265 and was commissioned by the Polish Navy in 1962. She served under the pennant number 292 (317 for a brief period) and was decommissioned in 1983.

In 1968, during Warsaw Pact fleet exercise on Barents Sea, together with the other Polish submarine , she avoided detection by huge Soviet and East Germany ASW forces, consisting of 300 ships - including nuclear submarines - and about 500 aircraft, and unnoticed entered into the biggest Soviet naval base in Murmansk. A year later, guided by radio-guidance from Poland, Orzeł intercepted in the North Sea a Soviet  and torpedoed her by dummy torpedoes. In implementing the Warsaw Pact's Cold War strategy, she also led patrols in the North Atlantic, doing jobs there such as a continuous reconnaissance in close distance to NATO's naval bases, including the most important U.S. strategic submarine base outside United States - Holy Loch in Scotland and also the base of Londonderry in Northern Ireland. She was also exercising the breaking of western  marine communication lines in the North Atlantic, as well as carrying out tasks in the North Atlantic training programs, including "Use of weapons and overcome ASW forces exercise program".

On 30 December 1983 she was decommissioned due to poor condition of her hull, after years of service, and scrapped in 1986. During her service, the ORP Orzeł was four times awarded as The Best Ship of Polish Navy (1963, 1965, 1972 and 1977).

References

Further reading

Whiskey-class submarines of the Polish Navy
1954 ships
Ships built in the Soviet Union
Ships built by Krasnoye Sormovo Factory No. 112